Rhantus tigris is a species of water beetle in the family Dytiscidae. It was discovered in 1995 by Balke.

References
Encyclopedia of Life: Rhantus
Dytiscidae Species List at Joel Hallan's Biology Catalog. Texas A&M University. Retrieved on May 7, 2012.

tigris
Beetles described in 1995